Bernardino Lunati (1452–1497) was an Italian Roman Catholic cardinal.

Biography

Bernardino Lunati was born in Pavia in 1452.   Early in his career, he was a protonotary apostolic.

He obtained the patronage of Cardinal Ascanio Sforza, who insisted that Lunati be made a cardinal.  As such, Pope Alexander VI made him a cardinal deacon in the consistory of 20 September 1493.  He received the red hat and the titulus of San Ciriaco alle Terme Diocleziane on 23 September 1493.  Immediately after he was raised to the cardinalate, Lunati was ordained as a priest.

He supported Cardinal Ascanio Sforza in Cardinal Sforza's dispute with the pope.  He was detained after visiting the Apostolic Palace on 9 December 1494.  However, he was allowed to participate in the consistory of December 11, 1494 and was then sent to Ostia.  From there, he joined Charles VIII of France and was part of his entourage when he entered Rome on 31 December 1494.  Following the agreement reached between the pope and the king on January 15, 1495, Cardinal Lunati traveled with Cardinal Sforza to Milan, returning to Rome with him on 21 February 1495.  He accompanied the pope to Orvieto on 27 May 1495 and returned with him to Rome on 27 June.

On 10 July 1495 he was named apostolic administrator of the see of Aquino, holding this post until 13 November 1495.  In the consistory of 26 October 1496 he was named papal legate to Guidobaldo da Montefeltro, Duke of Urbino, captain general of the papal troops, in the war against the Orsini family.  He was with the duke for the occupation of Anguillara Sabazia, Galera, Bassano, Sutri, Campagnano di Roma, Formello, Sacrofano, and Cesena.

He died during the siege of Bracciano, on 8 August 1497.  He is buried in Santa Maria del Popolo.

References

1452 births
1497 deaths
15th-century Italian cardinals
Religious leaders from Pavia